Arthur Hodge may refer to:

 Arthur William Hodge, the only British man ever to be hanged for the murder of a slave
 Arthur Hodge (colonial administrator), deputy governor of Anguilla

See also

 Arthur Hodges, the first person in Clark County, Arkansas to be executed by means of the electric chair.